Muhlenberg Township may refer to the following townships in the United States:

 Muhlenberg Township, Pickaway County, Ohio
 Muhlenberg Township, Berks County, Pennsylvania